Pick Yourself Up with Anita O'Day is an album by Anita O'Day that was released in 1957. O'Day sings with the Buddy Bregman orchestra and with Harry "Sweets" Edison.

Track listing

Personnel
 Anita O'Day – vocals
 Conte Candoli – trumpet
 Pete Candoli – trumpet
 Harry Edison – trumpet
 Ray Linn – trumpet
 Conrad Gozzo – trumpet
 Lloyd Ulyate – trombone
 Milt Bernhart – trombone
 Frank Rosolino – trombone
 George Roberts – trombone, bass trombone
 Herb Geller – alto saxophone
 Bud Shank – alto saxophone, tenor saxophone
 Georgie Auld – tenor saxophone
 Bob Cooper – tenor saxophone
 Jimmy Giuffre – baritone saxophone
 Paul Smith – piano
 Larry Bunker – vibraphone
 Al Hendrickson – guitar
 Barney Kessel – guitar
 Joe Mondragon – bass
 Alvin Stoller – drums

References

1957 albums
Anita O'Day albums
Albums arranged by Buddy Bregman
Verve Records albums
Albums produced by Norman Granz